Nicholas Charles Holmes (born 11 November 1954) is an English former professional footballer. He won the FA Cup Final with Southampton in 1976 and, from July 2002 to July 2009, was manager of Salisbury City.

Career
Holmes was born in Southampton and educated at St. Mary's College.

Southampton
Holmes was an apprentice with Southampton in the early 1970s. He made his first team debut on 2 March 1974 away to Arsenal. A natural left-sided player, he was equally at home at full-back, midfield, centre-back or sweeper. Holmes spent 14 years at The Dell. Naturally left-sided, he could play at left-back or midfield and was a thoughtful, yet thrusting, player who was as reliable as he was skilful.

He played at left-midfield in the 1976 F.A. Cup Final against Manchester United which Saints won 1–0, and also played and scored in the 1979 League Cup final against Nottingham Forest, which was lost 2–3. Between these two Wembley appearances, he was an integral member of the Southampton team that gained promotion from Division 2 at the end of the 1977–78 season.

He became club captain in March 1980, and on his 400th appearance for the club, Lawrie McMenemy praised his "reliability, dependability and flexibility", adding that he was "a man for all seasons".

On 16 August 1986, Saints recognised his loyalty by awarding him a testimonial match against John Mortimore's Benfica, which was won 4–1, with Holmes scoring one of the goals.

International honours eluded Holmes, although he was picked for England under-23 only for injury to prevent him playing.

His last appearance for Southampton was on 14 Feb 1987 at Tottenham Hotspur. A pelvic injury forced him to retire from the game in May 1987, by which time only Terry Paine and Mick Channon had made more appearances for the Saints. In total, he played 543 times for Southampton, scoring 64 goals.

After Southampton
After leaving Saints he spent the 1987–88 season with East Cowes Vics, before spending a season as coach back at Southampton working with manager Chris Nicholl. He left football in 1989.

Salisbury City
In July 2002, he was tempted back into football when he was offered the manager's job at Salisbury City. Under Holmes' management, Salisbury gained promotion to the Conference South in the 2005–06 season by finishing top of the Southern League Premier Division, followed by winning the play-off final in the 2006–07 season to participate in the Conference Premier in 2007–08.

In January 2008, following the departure of George Burley, Holmes was linked with a return to Southampton as manager. Although he was not offered the job, Holmes stated that Southampton was "the only club I'd leave Salisbury for". He became Salisbury's general manager in July 2009, with Tommy Widdrington taking control of the first team. Holmes left Salisbury on 14 July 2010 by mutual consent.

Honours

As a player
Southampton
FA Cup: 1976
Football League Cup runners-up: 1979
Football League First Division runners-up: 1983–84

As a manager
Salisbury City
Southern League Premier Division: 2005–06
Conference South play-offs: 2006–07

References

Bibliography 

1954 births
Living people
People educated at St Mary's College, Southampton
Footballers from Southampton
English footballers
Association football midfielders
Southampton F.C. players
English Football League players
English football managers
Salisbury City F.C. managers
National League (English football) managers
East Cowes Victoria Athletic A.F.C. players
 FA Cup Final players